The 2015 División Profesional season (officially the 2015 Copa TIGO- Visión Banco for sponsorship reasons) is the 81st season of top-flight professional football in Paraguay.

Teams

Stadia and location

Torneo Apertura
The Campeonato de Apertura, also the Copa TIGO-Visión Banco for sponsorship reasons, was the 112º official championship of the Primera División, called "Lic. Juan Ángel Napout", and is the first championship of the 2015 season. It began on January 30 and ended on May 31.

Standings

Torneo Clausura
The Campeonato de Clausura, also the Copa TIGO-Visión Banco for sponsorship reasons, is the 113º official championship of the Primera División, called "Luis Óscar Giagni", and is the last championship of the 2015 season. It began on July 4 and ended on December 6.

Standings

Clausura play-off
Because Olimpia and Cerro Porteño tied with 44 points, a title play-off on neutral ground was played as the tournament rules specify.

Aggregate table

Relegation
Relegations is determined at the end of the season by computing an average of the number of points earned per game over the past three seasons. The two teams with the lowest average are relegated to the División Intermedia for the following season. 
 Source: D10 Paraguay

See also
2015 in Paraguayan football

References

External links
APF's official website 
2015 season on RSSSF

Paraguay
1
Paraguayan Primera División seasons

es:Torneo Apertura 2015 (Paraguay)